Bishop Challoner Catholic College is a Roman Catholic secondary school in the Kings Heath area of Birmingham, England. The school has a roll of 1,152 students, including 212 sixth form students. More than the national average are entitled to free school meals. The school has Sports College and Science College status as well as being a recognised DfES Training School. It is a member of the Specialist Schools Trust.

History
Opened in 1953, it was the first Catholic secondary school in Birmingham. In 2000, the school was awarded Sports College status. In May 2002, the Science Department was granted lead department status and was awarded Science specialism status in 2005.

The school was named in July 2019 as a computing hub for the National Centre for Computing Education.

the school encountered some controversy in 2022 after being accused of racial discrimination concerning its hair policy

Arts
For the second time, the school has received a Government School Achievement Award for examination results, the National Curriculum Award and Artsmark Gold for the provision of drama, music, dance, art and performance in the school. The school's production of West Side Story, Beauty and the Beast, Big the Musical and We Will Rock You, have won the Columba Trophy for the best school production in Birmingham. The school has had its fair few alumni including Olympic gymnast Dominick Cunningham.

The Performing Arts, We Sing Show Choir were given the 'once-in-a-lifetime' opportunity of performing as part of the choir at the Mass which was taken by Pope Benedict XVI.  The Mass, held at Cofton Park in Longbridge, was the pinnacle of the Pope's visit to Great Britain and was his final visit before returning to the Vatican in Rome. After weeks of rehearsals, the 10 students and 3 teachers joined the 2200 other choristers from across the country and were seated in the Grandstand directly to the left of the Pope as he delivered the Mass.  Continuing this success, the Choir secured one of three places in the final of a national search for the UK's best Glee Club. The best club would win a once-in-a-lifetime opportunity to perform on the West End stage at London's Apollo Victoria Theatre, home of WICKED, in December 2010. The competition was judged by members of the WICKED cast including Lee Mead (BBC's Any Dream Will Do), Rachel Tucker (BBC's I'd Do Anything) and Louise Dearman at WICKED Day.

Academic performance
The school has improved since 1998 when 37% of pupils received 5 or more A*-C grades at GCSE. In 2008, this figure had risen to over 80% of pupils receiving 5 or more A*-C grades.
In March 2009 the school achieved an 'Outstanding' grade in its Section 5 and Section 48 OFSTED inspection reports.

References

1953 establishments in England
Catholic secondary schools in the Archdiocese of Birmingham
Educational institutions established in 1953
Secondary schools in Birmingham, West Midlands
Training schools in England
Voluntary aided schools in England